The Bangladesh Open is a golf tournament on the Asian Tour. The inaugural tournament was played from 27 to 30 May 2015 at Kurmitola Golf Club, in Dhaka, Bangladesh.

Winners

Notes

References

External links
Coverage on the Asian Tour's official site

Asian Tour events
Golf tournaments in Bangladesh
Recurring sporting events established in 2015
2015 establishments in Bangladesh